The Liga Națională, formerly known as Divizia A, is the women's top-tier professional basketball league of Romania. Established in 1950, it is currently contested by eleven teams. Universitatea Cluj-Napoca is the Liga Națională's most successful club with fourteen titles including a ten-years winning streak between 1984 and 1994, while CSM Târgoviște and ICIM Arad have dominated the championship in subsequent years with ten and eight titles respectively.

In 2013 the Romanian champion took part in the FIBA Euroleague for the first time since the competition's refoundation in 1997.

Titles

See also
 Romanian Men's Basketball League

References

External links
Official Site of the Federation
Total Baschet (Romanian)

 
Women's basketball competitions in Romania
Romania
Sports leagues established in 1950
Professional sports leagues in Romania